Carpineto is a village in Tuscany, central Italy, in the comune of Sovicille, province of Siena. At the time of the 2001 census its population was 349.

Carpineto is about 9 km from Siena and 8 km from Sovicille.

References 

Frazioni of Sovicille